William Bennett (May 31, 1956 – February 28, 2013) was an American musician.  He was the principal oboist for the San Francisco Symphony Orchestra.

Life
Bennett was born in New Haven, Connecticut, where his father William R. Bennett Jr. was a university professor.  He joined the San Francisco Symphony in 1979, and was promoted to principal oboist in 1987, after Marc Lifschey's retirement.

John Harbison's oboe concerto was written for him.

Bennett died in San Francisco on February 28, 2013, a few days after collapsing on stage during a performance of the Oboe Concerto by Richard Strauss.  He was 56 and is survived by his wife and two children.

References

1956 births
2013 deaths
Musicians from New Haven, Connecticut
American classical oboists
Male oboists
20th-century classical musicians
20th-century American male musicians